Australia competed at the 1920 Summer Olympics in Antwerp, Belgium.  Australian athletes have competed in every Summer Olympic Games.

A brother and sister combination swam for  Australia, Frank and Lily Beaurepaire.

Medalists

Aquatics

Diving

One diver represented Australia in 1920. It was the nation's debut in the sport. Beaurepaire finished fourth in her semifinal group in the 10 metre platform, just outside the top three needed to qualify for the final.

 Women

Ranks given are within the semifinal group.

Swimming

Six swimmers, including one woman, represented Australia in 1920. It was the nation's second independent appearance in the sport. All five of the men were involved in the silver medal-winning relay team, though Kirkland is not credited with a medal by the IOC; he was replaced by Frank Beaurepaire after the semifinals. Beaurepaire won an individual bronze in the 1500 metres; his sister Lily was unable to advance to the finals in either of her events as Australia's sole female swimmer.

Ranks given are within the heat.

 Men

 Women

Athletics

Four athletes represented Australia in 1920. It was the nation's fourth appearance in the sport. Parker's silver medal in the short racewalk was the nation's first medal since 1900.

Ranks given are within the heat.

Cycling

Two cyclists represented Australia in 1920. It was the nation's debut in the sport. Halpin advanced to the semifinals in the sprint, while King was eliminated in the heats. King also competed in the 50 kilometres, but did not finish.

Track cycling

Ranks given are within the heat.

Tennis

A single tennis player competed for Australia in 1920. It was the nation's second appearance in the sport.

References

 
 
International Olympic Committee results database
Australian Olympic Committee
sports-reference

Nations at the 1920 Summer Olympics
1920
Olympics